Mount Silali is a dormant volcano in the Gregory Rift Valley, near Kapedo, Kenya.

Geology

Mount Silali is part of a group of volcanoes, the others being Paka and Korosi, in the Loyamoruk Plains of the eastern Nginyang Division of Baringo County.
Silali is a recent volcano that became active from 400,000 to 220,000 years ago, and was still active 7,000 years ago. It is the largest caldera volcano in the Gregory Rift Valley.  Its pre-caldera development began with mainly peralkaline trachyte lavas and pyroclasts, succeeded by mildly alkaline to transitional basalts.  The basalts of the mountain are similar in composition to oceanic island basalts, but have a range of isotopes indicating a variety of origins.

The Kenya rift is oriented north-south, and in the past the minimum horizontal tectonic stress direction was east-west, the direction of extension. The alignment of rows of recently formed small vents, cones, domes and collapse pits in the Silali region indicates that the minimum horizontal stress direction has changed to NW-SE within the last half million years.

Environment

Rainfall averages , with wide variations.
The thorn-bush savannah plain has no permanent source of water, with the Nginyang River flowing only after rains.
There are some highland pastures on Mount Silali with perennial grasses.
From oral accounts, the environment has become significantly drier in the last few decades, and with less grass and fewer types of grass.

Energy potential

The mountain is potentially a source of geothermal energy.
In September 2011 the Geothermal Development Company (GDC) of Kenya said that 19 companies had submitted bids to develop geothermal power plants at Lake Bogoria and at Silali. GDC intended to choose eight companies, each to build one 100 MW power plant. They expected the plants to start coming on line in 2017.

References

Sources

External links

Volcanoes of Kenya
Dormant volcanoes
Baringo County